Mark Catesby (24 March 1683 – 23 December 1749) was an English naturalist who studied the flora and fauna of the New World. Between 1729 and 1747, Catesby published his Natural History of Carolina, Florida and the Bahama Islands, the first published account of the flora and fauna of North America. It included 220 plates of birds, reptiles, amphibians, fish, insects, mammals and plants.

Life and works
Catesby was born on 24 March 1683 and baptised at Castle Hedingham, Essex on 30 March 1683. His father, John Catesby (buried 12 November 1703), was a local politician and gentleman farmer. His mother was Elizabeth Jekyll (buried 5 September 1708). The family owned a farm and house, Holgate, in Sudbury, Suffolk as well as property in London. An acquaintance with the naturalist John Ray led to Catesby becoming interested in natural history. The death of his father left Catesby enough to live on, so in 1712, he accompanied his sister Elizabeth to Williamsburg, Virginia. She was the wife of Dr. William Cocke, who had been a member of the Council and Secretary of State for the Colony of Virginia. According to their father's will, Elizabeth had married Dr. Cocke against her father's wishes. Catesby visited the West Indies in 1714, and returned to Virginia, then home to England in 1719.

Catesby had collected seeds and botanical specimens in Virginia and Jamaica. He sent the pressed specimens to Dr Samuel Dale of Braintree in Essex, and gave seeds to a Hoxton nurseryman Thomas Fairchild as well as to Dale and to the Bishop of London, Dr Henry Compton. Plants from Virginia, raised from Catesby's seeds, made his name known to gardeners and scientists in England, and in 1722 he was recommended by William Sherard to undertake a plant-collecting expedition to Carolina on behalf of certain members of the Royal Society. From May 1722, Catesby was based in Charleston, South Carolina, and travelled to other parts of that colony, collecting plants and animals. He sent preserved specimens to Hans Sloane and to William Sherard, and seeds to various contacts including Sherard and Peter Collinson. Consequently, Catesby was responsible for introducing such plants as Catalpa bignonioides and the eponymous Catesbaea spinosa (lilythorn) to cultivation in Europe. Catesby returned to England in 1726.

Catesby spent the next twenty years preparing and publishing his Natural History. Publication was financed by subscriptions from his "Encouragers" as well as an interest-free loan from one of the fellows of the Royal Society, the Quaker Peter Collinson. Catesby learnt how to etch the copper plates himself. The first eight plates had no backgrounds, but from then on Catesby included plants with his animals. He completed the first part in May 1729 and presented it to Queen Caroline; first volume, comprising five parts, was finished in November 1732. Mark Catesby was elected a fellow of the Royal Society in February 1733 and was made a member of the Society of Gentlemen of Spalding in December 1743. The second volume containing another five parts was completed in December 1743, and in 1747 he produced a supplement from material sent to him by friends in America, particularly John Bartram, and also his younger brother, John, who was based with a British regiment in Gibraltar. Not all the plates in Natural history are by Catesby: several, including the splendid and famous image of Magnolia grandiflora were by Georg Ehret. Catesby's original preparatory drawings for Natural History of Carolina, Florida and the Bahama Islands are in the Royal Library, Windsor Castle, and selections have been exhibited in USA, Japan and various places in England including at the Queen's Gallery, London, in 1997–1998, and Gainsborough House in Sudbury in 2015.
On 5 March 1747, Catesby read a paper entitled "Of birds of passage" to the Royal Society in London, and he is now recognised as one of the first people to describe bird migration.

Mark Catesby married Elizabeth Rowland on 8 October 1747 in St George's Chapel, Hyde Park Corner, but they had been a couple for about 17 years, having at least six children between April 1731 and June 1740. They were parishioners of St Giles Cripplegate in London and later, when that parish was subdivided, of St Luke Old Street. He died just before Christmas 1749 on Saturday 23 December in his house behind St Luke Old Street, London, and was buried in its churchyard. His grave is now lost. Catesby's Hortus britanno-americanus ... was published posthumously in 1763, and a second edition, entitled Hortus Europae americanus ... was issued in 1767.

The Swedish naturalist Carl Linnaeus included information from Catesby's Natural History in the 10th edition of his Systema Naturae (1758).

Legacy
Catesbaea, lilythorn, a genus of thorny shrubs belonging to Rubiaceae (madder family) from the West Indies and southeastern USA was named after Catesby, originally by J. K. Gronovius. However, under present rules of nomenclature, this name was formally published by Linnaeus in 1753 in his Species plantarum (volume 1, pp 108–109), based on plate 100 in volume two of Catesby's Natural history of Carolina, Florida and the Bahama Islands.

The American bullfrog, Lithobates catesbeianus, is named in honor of Catesby.

Catesby is commemorated in the scientific names of two species of New World snakes: Dipsas catesbyi and Uromacer catesbyi.

See also
List of wildlife artists

References

Further reading

Frick, George Frederick; Stearns, Raymond Phineas (1961). Mark Catesby: The Colonial Audubon. Urbana: The University of Illinois Press. 
Jackson, Christine E. (1985). Bird Etchings: The Illustrators and Their Books, 1655-1855. Ithaca: Cornell University Press. .
Wiatt, Alex L. (1992). The Descendants of Stephen Field of King and Queen County, Virginia, 1721. Fredericksburg, Virginia: BookCrafters.
McBurney, Henrietta; Myers, Amy R. W. (1997). Mark Catesby's Natural History of America. The watercolours from the Royal Library Windsor Castle. London: Merrell Holberton, in association with The Museum of Fine Arts, Houston. .
Myers, Amy R. W.; Pritchard, M. B. (1998). Empire's Nature: Mark Catesby's New World Vision. Chapel Hill and London: University of North Carolina Press. .
Walters, Michael (2003). A Concise History of Ornithology. London: Christopher Helm. .
Nelson, E. Charles; Elliott, David J. (2015). The Curious Mister Catesby: a "truly ingenious" naturalist explores new worlds. Athens, Georgia: University of Georgia Press. 
McBurney, Henrietta (2021). Illuminating Natural History: The Art and Science of Mark Catesby. New Haven and London: Yale University Press.

External links

Catesby, Mark (1729–32). The Natural History of Carolina, Florida and (v1). Online scanned edition from Rare Book Room.
Catesby, Mark (1734–43, 1747). The Natural History of Carolina, Florida and (v2). Online scanned edition from Rare Book Room.
Catesby, Mark (1729–1747). The Natural History of Carolina, Florida and the Bahamas Electronic edition: high quality images and user-friendly text from the American Studies Programs at the University of Virginia.
University of South Florida Libraries: Catesby Collection
View works by Mark Catesby online at the Biodiversity Heritage Library.
Digitized works by Mark Catesby at the John Carter Brown Library can be viewed here.

1683 births
1749 deaths
People from Castle Hedingham
English botanists
English naturalists
English ornithologists
Fellows of the Royal Society
Natural history of the Bahamas
Natural history of Florida
Natural history of North Carolina
Natural history of South Carolina
Natural history of the Caribbean
British bird artists
Botanical illustrators